TmaxSoft is a South Korea-based multinational corporation specializing in enterprise software. It was founded in 1997 by Professor Daeyeon Park, former professor at KAIST (Korea Advanced Institute of Science and Technology). The company is separated into 3 businesses: TmaxSoft, TmaxData and TmaxA&C. Currently, TmaxData and TmaxA&C are run as affiliated companies.

The company started as a middleware provider. It is now the largest provider of enterprise software systems in South Korea, as of 2007  and is a member of the JCP. 
Its middleware products include Tmax (Transaction Process Monitoring), JEUS (Web Application Server), and the WebtoB (Web Server). Other products include Tibero (DMBS), ProSync, SysMaster (Application Performance Monitoring), ProFrame (Application Framework for banking), OpenFrame (Mainframe legacy rehosting), TmaxOS (Desktop Operating System), TmaxOffice, ToGate (Web browser), Prozone (Cloud), and big data (ZetaData, HyperData, and AnyMiner).

History
 1997  Company founded, Tmax  TP Monitor launched
 2000  JEUS launched, WebtoB launched, Tmax Japan founded
 2002  J2EE 1.2 certified, JCP joined, OpenFrame launched, Tmax US founded
 2003  Tibero DBMS launched, Tibero incorporated, ProFrame launched, Anylink launched, Tmax China founded
 2009  JEUS(TM) positioned in 'Visionary' Gartner Magic Quadrant
 2006  Java EE5 certified (World 1st), Web Application Server #1 market share in Korean market
 2010  KT Innotz Joint Venture founded, G Corp project in US sales
 2011  JEUS(TM) positioned in 'Visionary' Gartner Magic Quadrant

 2012  Web Application Server #1 market share in Korean market for 10 years, Awarded "Best Software Business 
 2013  Tmax Singapore, Tmax Russia, Tmax UK founded
 2014  Tmax Brazil founded
 2016  TmaxSoft designates its Chicago office as its global headquarters and appoints Joshua Yulish as new global CEO
 2017 TmaxSoft names John Yun as new CTO
 2018 TmaxSoft names Moses Mathuram VP of Global Channels 
 2019 TmaxSoft appoints Kv Suresh as new Global CEO and President

In 1997, TmaxSoft developed Tmax, a standard TP-monitor, it was the first of its kind to be developed in Korea and only the second in the world. In 2000, TmaxSoft released JEUS and WebtoB. In 2001, it received J2EE 1.2 certification (US Sun Microsystems –JEUS 3.0), and J2EE 1.3 certification (US Sun Microsystems –JEUS 4.0) the following year. It also released SkyMail and SysKeeper EAM.  In 2003, TmaxSoft released AnyLink and Tibero, and received the world's first J2EE 1.4 certification (US Sun Microsystems),.  TmaxSoft opened a new R&D center in Seohyeon-dong, Bundang.  TmaxSoft released OpenFrame, JEUS 5.0, BizMaster, SysMaster, and SysKeeper OS in 2004.

Until 2010, TmaxSoft operated an affiliate company developing operating systems, called TmaxCore. It was sold to Samsung SDS in June 2010.,

Company expansion
In recent years the company has experienced growth both domestically and globally, establishing subsidiaries in Japan (2000), USA (2002), China (2003), Singapore (2013), UK (2013), Russia (2013), and Brazil (2014).
In the domestic market Tmax enjoys a 42.1% share of the middleware market with most major financial and government institutions utilizing the company's products.

References

Software companies of South Korea
South Korean brands